Blastobasis athymopa is a moth in the  family Blastobasidae. It was described by Edward Meyrick in 1932. It is found in the West Indies.

References

Natural History Museum Lepidoptera generic names catalog

Blastobasis
Moths described in 1932
Moths of the Caribbean
Taxa named by Edward Meyrick